Pimelea altior is a species of flowering plant in the family Thymelaeaceae and is endemic to eastern Australia. It is a shrub with elliptic leaves and heads of white, tube-shaped flowers.

Description
Flowering occurs sporadically throughout the year.

Taxonomy
Pimelea altior was first formally described in 1859 by Ferdinand von Mueller in Fragmenta Phytographiae Australiae from specimens collected near Moreton Bay. The specific epithet (altior) means "higher".

Distribution and habitat
This pimealea grows in tall forests and on the edges of rainforest from near Eumundi in south-east Queensland to near Taree in northern New South Wales.

References

altior
Flora of New South Wales
Flora of Queensland
Malvales of Australia
Plants described in 1859
Taxa named by Ferdinand von Mueller